The Maserati Brothers were involved with automobiles from the beginning of the 20th century. They were born to Rodolfo Maserati and his wife Carolina in Voghera, Lombardy, Italy.  Rodolfo was a railway worker from Piacenza, driving a heavy Krupp locomotive, and married Carolina Losi.  They had  seven sons in total, but only six reached adulthood, as Alfieri I was only 1 year old when he died. After the death of Alfieri I, the next son to be born was also named Alfieri. Alfieri, along with the remaining five brothers, Carlo, Bindo, Mario, Ettore and Ernesto, contributed to the sports luxury automobile manufacturer Maserati in one way or another.

The Maserati brothers were:
 Carlo (1881–1910)
 Bindo (1883–1980)
 Alfieri I (1885–1886)
 Alfieri II (23 September 1887–3 March 1932)
 Mario (1890–1981), painter and artist based in Bologna, Milan and Novi Ligure
 Ettore (1894–4 August 1990)
 Ernesto (4 August 1898–1 December 1975)

A memorial plaque for Alfieri II was placed at their birthplace in 1987.  Since 1989, the istituto tecnico of Voghera has added Alfieri II to his official name, to become Istituto Tecnico Industriale di Voghera "Alfieri Maserati" Also, the city of Bologna has a street named Via Maserati.

References

External links

 Maserati Google map

 
People from Voghera
Maserati people
People of Emilian descent